Carlo Carcano (26 February 1891 – 23 June 1965) was an Italian footballer and manager who played as a midfielder.

Club career 
Carcano was born in Varese. As a player, he was a one club man, playing for Alessandria.

International career 
At international level, Carcano also represented Italy on 5 occasions between 1915 and 1921, scoring once.

Managerial career 
After he retired from playing, Carcano moved into management to much acclaim. He led Juventus to four consecutive league titles; the first of only two managers in Italy football history (alongside Massimiliano Allegri) to win four in a row. He later also managed the Italy national football team.

He was suddenly removed from the Juventus club in December 1934 in order to stifle a homosexual scandal in which he was involved by elements of society hostile to him. He remained on the edge of the football world for a decade.

Personal life 
Carcano died in Sanremo, aged 74, on 23 June 1965.

Carlin's Boys 
In 1947 in Sanremo Carlo Carcano was one of the co-founder of A.S.D. Carlin's Boys, a town football team famous above all for the youth sector that in the 2014–15 season playing in Promozione Liguria A and obtaining the promotion to Eccellenza Liguria is the main team of the city. In the same season the club won also Coppa Italia of Promozione Liguria and the title of Champion of Promozione Liguria.

The current president is Renato Bersano, while the coach is Valentino Papa.

The club organizes, every year in the last week of August, the Torneo Internazionale Sanremo reserved for the category Allievi, with the participation of the most prestigious and famous junior teams of the world football.

Honours

Manager

Club
Juventus
Serie A: 1930–31, 1931–32, 1932–33, 1933–34

Individual
Italian Football Hall of Fame: 2014

References

1891 births
1965 deaths
Association football midfielders
Italian footballers
Italy international footballers
Juventus F.C. managers
Inter Milan managers
Italy national football team managers
Italian football managers
U.S. Alessandria Calcio 1912 players
Inter Milan players
Atalanta B.C. players
S.S.C. Napoli players
Serie A managers
Sportspeople from the Province of Varese
U.S. Alessandria Calcio 1912 managers
S.S.C. Napoli managers
Atalanta B.C. managers
Footballers from Lombardy